Black point compensation is a technique used in digital photography printing. It is a method of creating adjustments between the maximum black levels of digital files and the black capabilities of various digital devices.

References

 https://web.archive.org/web/20070225064425/http://ronbigelow.com/articles/levels/levels4/levels4.htm

Digital photography